Alovera is a municipality located in the province of Guadalajara, Castile-La Mancha, Spain. According to the 2015 census (INE), the municipality has a population of 12,247 inhabitants.

History 
Since the discovery of a Roman cupae (a tomb) in 1999 in the restoration of the St. Michael´s Church, we know there was a Roman settlement in Alovera. This cupae was dated in the 1st or 2nd century. Juan Manuel Abascal and Armin Stylow, from Universidad de Alcalá, concluded that the text written on the cupae was "(monument to) Pompeyo Fusco, 60 years old. It was commissioned by his wife Antonia Melusa". Apart from the cupae, it is thought that one of the column bases of the St. Michael´s Church belonged to the peristyle of a Roman villa.

Also we know there was a Visigothic settlement in Alovera thanks to a couple of brooches which are on display at Museo Arquelógico Nacional, in Madrid. This brooches known as fibulas were made in the 6th century by the cloisonné technique.

The first documents to mention Alovera were written in the 16th century. By then, Alovera was a farmer settlement which lands belonged to the monasteries of St. Bartholomew of Lupiana, St. Clair and St. Bernard.

In the 16th century, St. Michael´s Church was built by master Nicolás de Ribero helped bay Juan de Buerga and Juan Ballesteros. In 1690 finished the construction. The church is composed of three naves, a bell tower and an atrium. The main altarpiece was built in the 17th century by Juan, Pedro and Francisco González, followers of classical manichaeism. Also, there are a St. Gregory altarpiece made by the disciples of Juan de Borgoña and Juan Correa de Vivar and, in the sacristy, a Pieta painting by Willem Key.

In 1626, Felipe II gives to Alovera the title of villa. Then, the Villahermosa de Alovera was sold to Lorenza de Sotomayor, marquess of Alovera. Nowadays, there is still a marquess of Alovera.

Government

Municipal elections (2015) 
 Alternativa Alovera, 5 councillors (+2)
 Maria Purificación Tortuero Pliego, mayor and councillor of human resources and intern regime, civic protection, education and culture and internal revenue.
 Juan Antonio Ruiz Moratilla, first mayor deputy and councillor of management of urban developments, infrastructure and environment and mobility.
 María Jesús Payo Cabas, second mayor deputy and councillor of neighbours and participation, communications and new technologies and economic promotion and business.
 Juan Ramón Arenal Enríquez, councillor of sports and festivities.
 María Dolores Trigo Campos, councillor of social welfare and equality and family and youth.
 PP (People´s Party), 5 councillors (-2)
 Juan Carlos Martín Martínez
 José Luis Peña Velasco
 José Luis Torres Jiménez
 María Dolores Llorca Pereira
 Gema Taravillo Barrero
 Ahora Alovera (Unidos Podemos), 3 councillors (+3)
 Celia Rollón Blanco
 Julián Martínez Pérez
 Ana Isabel del Val Rodríguez
 PSOE (Socialist Party), 2 councillors (-3)
 Ángel Mora Blanco
 Antonia Recuero Navarro
 Cs (Ciudadanos), 2 councillors (+2)
 Marta Usano Pradillo
 José María González Martínez

References

Municipalities in the Province of Guadalajara